Tom Middleton is a Canadian pop singer from Victoria, British Columbia.

His first band, The Marquis, broke up in 1969. He struck out on his own, becoming a mainstay on the Vancouver circuit while writing material. He connected with manager Howard Leese in 1972, signed a deal with Columbia Records, and went into the studio with producer Mike Flicker to record the album It Wouldn't Have Made Any Difference, which was released in May 1973. The title track, interpolated with "Lovelight Suite," made the Canadian top 40 for a month.

He released his sophomore record, "One Night Lovers," in early 1976 after the title track peaked at #35. It was followed by "I Need A Harbour For My Soul," backed with "I'll Comfort You," which charted. In late 1976, Middleton was dropped by Columbia Records and he retired a few months later.

Middleton reunited The Marquis in 1990 for a fundraiser for a boys' soccer team and he would perform on and off for the next few years. He still occasionally makes appearances on the west coast, playing blues and jazz festivals as well as occasional club dates.

Singles
"It Wouldn't Have Made Any Difference" (1973) (#10 CAN)

References

Living people
Canadian male singers
Year of birth missing (living people)
Place of birth missing (living people)